The term cosmography has two distinct meanings: traditionally it has been the protoscience of mapping the general features of the cosmos, heaven and Earth; more recently, it has been used to describe the ongoing effort to determine the large-scale features of the observable universe.

Traditional usage 
The 14th-century work 'Aja'ib al-makhluqat wa-ghara'ib al-mawjudat by Persian physician Zakariya al-Qazwini is considered to be an early work of cosmography. Traditional Hindu, Buddhist and Jain cosmography schematize a universe centered on Mount Meru surrounded by rivers, continents and seas. These cosmographies posit a universe being repeatedly created and destroyed over time cycles of immense lengths.

In 1551, Martín Cortés de Albacar, from Zaragoza, Spain, published Breve compendio de la esfera y del arte de navegar. Translated into English and reprinted several times, the work was of great influence in Britain for many years. He proposed spherical charts and mentioned magnetic deviation and the existence of magnetic poles.

Peter Heylin's 1652 book Cosmographie (enlarged from his Microcosmos of 1621) was one of the earliest attempts to describe the entire world in English, and being the first known description of Australia and among the first of California. The book has 4 sections, examining the geography, politics, and cultures of Europe, Asia, Africa, and America, with an addendum on Terra Incognita, including Australia, and extending to Utopia, Fairyland, and the "Land of Chivalrie".

In 1659, Thomas Porter published a smaller, but extensive Compendious Description of the Whole World, which also included a chronology of world events from Creation forward. These were all part of a major trend in the European Renaissance to explore (and perhaps comprehend) the known world.

Modern usage 
In astrophysics, the term "cosmography" is beginning to be used to describe attempts to determine the large-scale matter distribution and kinematics of the observable universe, dependent on the Friedmann–Lemaître–Robertson–Walker metric but independent of the temporal dependence of the scale factor on the matter/energy composition of the Universe.

In recent decades, an acceleration in the expansion of the Universe has been observed. Several dynamic mechanisms have been proposed to explain this otherwise mysterious phenomenon. These include modified gravity and dark energy. Many observations focus on the high-redshift region. For example, the supernova in a joint light-curve analysis (JLA) compilation can span the redshift region up to 1.3; the cosmic microwave background (CMB) even can retrospect to the very early universe at z ~ 1100. To legitimate the expansion at high redshift, they introduced an improved redshift parametrization y = z/(1 + z) cosmography in the y-based expansion is mathematically safe and useful, because of 0 < y < 1, even for the high redshift. Later, some other methods of redshift were also proposed

The word was also commonly used by Buckminster Fuller in his lectures.

See also

 Johann Bayer
 Andreas Cellarius
 Cosmographia
 Julius Schiller
 Star cartography
 Chronology of the Universe
 Cosmogony
 Cosmology
 Timeline of cosmological theories
 Timeline of knowledge about galaxies, clusters of galaxies, and large-scale structure
 Large-scale structure of the cosmos
 Timeline of astronomical maps, catalogs, and surveys

References

Physical cosmology